Liam Carroll (born 6 June 1946) is an Irish judoka. He competed in the men's half-middleweight event at the 1972 Summer Olympics.

References

1946 births
Living people
Irish male judoka
Olympic judoka of Ireland
Judoka at the 1972 Summer Olympics
Place of birth missing (living people)
20th-century Irish people